Elías Eliseo Emigdio Abarca (born 13 June 1991) is a Mexican professional boxer. As an amateur, he competed in the men's flyweight event at the 2016 Summer Olympics.

References

External links
 

1991 births
Living people
Mexican male boxers
Olympic boxers of Mexico
Boxers at the 2016 Summer Olympics
Flyweight boxers
Boxers from Guerrero